The Mastercard New York Mini 10K is an annual 10-kilometer road running competition for women that takes place in Central Park, New York City, in the United States. The race has been organised by New York Road Runners since 1972. The competition has both an elite-level race and a fun run, both of which accounted for a total of 5189 finishers in 2010.

The idea of a 10K women's race was the joint vision of elite runners Nina Kuscsik and Kathrine Switzer, and New York City Marathon co-director Fred Lebow – in the early 1970s, there was a dearth of women's road racing competitions. The race's inaugural sponsor Johnson Wax (who were promoting a women's shaving gel called Crazylegs) suggested a full marathon event (26 miles and 385 yards), but it was decided that a more manageable "mini marathon" race over 6 miles would be held. A total of 78 runners took part in the race, which was the world's first women-only road racing competition.

The course of the road race begins near 61st Street on Central Park West and heads north, entering Central Park at West 90th Street. The route loops in a clockwise direction, turning southwards at Harlem Meer around the 3-mile (5-kilometre) mark. It continues south past the Central Park Reservoir and the Guggenheim Museum. Runners continue southwards until they come towards the park's limits near Wollman Rink at which point it heads to the west and turns north to the finishing point near the Tavern on the Green and Sheep Meadow.

The course record is held by Asmae Leghzaoui of Morocco, who finished the race in 30:29 to win the 2002 edition. Grete Waitz and Tegla Loroupe are the race's most successful athletes, with both of them having each won the race on five separate occasions. Following her death in 2011, the 40th edition of the race was dedicated to Waitz.

Past winners

Key:

Statistics

Winners by country

Multiple winners

References

List of winners
Post, Marty & Leydig, Jack (2010-06-14). New York Mini-Marathon 10 km. Association of Road Racing Statisticians. Retrieved on 2010-06-15.

External links
Official website at New York Road Runners
Oakley New York Mini 10K at Shtoor Events

10K runs
Road running competitions in the United States
Recurring sporting events established in 1972
Sports competitions in New York City
Central Park
Women's athletics competitions
Women's sports in New York (state)
Annual sporting events in the United States
Women in New York City